Cumberland House is a Grade I listed building in the city centre of York, in England.

The house lies on King's Staith, overlooking the River Ouse.  While the basement is accessed from King's Staith, because the street frequently floods, the house's main entrance is on Cumberland Street.  It was built in about 1710 by William Cornwell, an industrialist who subsequently became Lord Mayor of York.  The house itself acquired its name in the 1740s, with the Prince William, Duke of Cumberland, supposedly having stayed there on 23 July 1746, following his victory at the Battle of Culloden.

The house formed the water front end of the entrance to a medieval street known as Middle Water Lane, until that street was demolished in a slum clearance program in the mid 19th century. The street was rebuilt and renamed as Cumberland Street in the late 19th century.

The house is built of brick, although the basement and some features are of magnesian limestone.  It is of two main storeys, with an attic and basement, and has five bays facing King's Staith.  Inside, the two main reception rooms and staircase preserve their original features, and there are original fireplaces upstairs, but the service wing of the house, to the east, was remodelled in the 20th-century.  The house was restored from 1950 onwards.

References

Grade I listed buildings in York
Grade I listed houses
Houses completed in 1710
Houses in North Yorkshire